Whispering Pines is a neighborhood located in Appleton, Outagamie County, Wisconsin, United States.

Geography

References

Neighborhoods in Wisconsin
Appleton, Wisconsin
Populated places in Outagamie County, Wisconsin